The 2017 IIHF Women's World Championship was an international Ice hockey tournament run by the International Ice Hockey Federation. It was held in Plymouth Township, Michigan, United States from 31 March to 7 April 2017. The USA Hockey Arena served as the event's venue using Arena I and Arena II.

The United States defeated Canada in the gold medal game 3–2 after overtime, winning their eighth title. Finland won the bronze medal by beating Germany 8–0.

Venues

Participants

Group A
 – Hosts

Group B

 – Promoted from Division I Group A in 2016

Match officials
10 referees and 9 linesmen were selected for the tournament.

Referees
 Dina Allen
 Gabrielle Ariano-Lortie
 Nikoleta Celárová
 Anna Eskola
 Drahomira Fialova
 Gabriella Gran
 Nicole Hertrich
 Aina Hove
 Miyuki Nakayama
 Melissa Szkola

Linesmen
 Bettina Angerer
 Veronica Johansson
 Michaela Kúdeľová
 Jessica Leclerc
 Lisa Linnek
 Ilona Novotná
 Nataša Pagon
 Johanna Tauriainen
 Justine Todd

Rosters

Each team's roster consists of at least 15 skaters (forwards, and defencemen) and 2 goaltenders, and at most 20 skaters and 3 goaltenders. All eight participating nations, through the confirmation of their respective national associations, had to submit a "Long List" roster no later than two weeks before the tournament, and a final roster by the Passport Control meeting prior to the start of tournament.

Preliminary round
All times are local (UTC−4).

Group A

Group B

Relegation round
The third and fourth placed team from Group B played a best-of-three series to determine the relegated team.  The IIHF opted to expand the World Championship to ten teams starting in 2019, so no team was relegated after all.

Switzerland won series 2–1

Final round

Bracket

Quarterfinals

Semifinals

Fifth place game

Bronze medal game

Gold medal game

Statistics

Final standings

Scoring leaders
List shows the top skaters sorted by points, then goals.

GP = Games played; G = Goals; A = Assists; Pts = Points; +/− = Plus/minus; PIM = Penalties in minutes; POS = Position
Source: IIHF.com

Leading goaltenders
Only the top five goaltenders, based on save percentage, who have played at least 40% of their team's minutes, are included in this list.

TOI = Time on Ice (minutes:seconds); SA = Shots against; GA = Goals against; GAA = Goals against average; Sv% = Save percentage; SO = Shutouts
Source: IIHF.com

Awards
Best players selected by the directorate:
Best Goaltender:  Noora Räty
Best Defenceman:  Jenni Hiirikoski
Best Forward:  Brianna Decker
Source: IIHF.com

All-star team
Goaltender:  Noora Räty
Defence:  Monique Lamoureux,  Jenni Hiirikoski
Forwards:  Marie-Philip Poulin,  Brianna Decker,  Kendall Coyne
MVP:  Brianna Decker
Source: IIHF.com

Threatened boycott by US players
On 15 March 2017, the U.S. team announced that unless concessions were made by USA Hockey, they would boycott the World Championship to protest inequitable support and conditions for women's hockey. The players were publicly supported by the players' associations for the NBA, WNBA, MLB, NFL, and the NHL. 

After several days of stalled negotiations and attempts to field a team of non-boycotting players, causing concern over such a team being competitive, an agreement was struck with USA Hockey to increase player pay and support for women's development; the original players immediately agreed to play in the World Championship.

References

External links
Official website

IIHF Women's World Championship
2017 IIHF Women's World Championship
IIHF Women's World Championship
IIHF Women's World Championship
IIHF Women's
March 2017 sports events in the United States
April 2017 sports events in the United States
Sports competitions in Michigan
Women's ice hockey competitions in the United States
2017
Women's sports in Michigan